The 1875 Whitehaven by-election was fought on 16 December 1875.  The byelection was fought due to the incumbent Conservative MP, George Cavendish-Bentinck, becoming Judge Advocate General.  It was retained by the incumbent.

References

1875 elections in the United Kingdom
1875 in England
19th century in Cumberland
By-elections to the Parliament of the United Kingdom in Cumbria constituencies
Ministerial by-elections to the Parliament of the United Kingdom
December 1875 events